HOTD may refer to:

 Hair of the Dog (disambiguation)
 Highschool of the Dead, an anime and manga series
 The House of the Dead (disambiguation)
 House of the Dragon, an HBO live action TV series